Walter James Clune (February 20, 1930 – February 3, 1998) was a Canadian professional ice hockey defenceman who played 5 games in the National Hockey League for the Montreal Canadiens. He was born in Toronto, Ontario.

External links

1930 births
1998 deaths
Boston Olympics players
Canadian ice hockey defencemen
Ice hockey people from Toronto
Montreal Canadiens players